The World Sturgeon Conservation Society (WSCS) is an international association of scientists. Its aim is to conserve existing sturgeon populations worldwide and help in their restoration. The society pursues this goal by promoting sturgeon research, holding workshops and conferences, promoting the exchange of sturgeon-related information between scientists and politicians, and by informing the general public about sturgeons.

The WSCS has its seat in Neu Wulmstorf, Germany, where it was founded in 2003. The President of WSCS is Harald Rosenthal.

External links
 Official Website

International scientific organizations
Sturgeons
Fish conservation organizations
Organizations established in 2003
Environmental organisations based in Germany
2003 establishments in Germany